Eisenborn is a village in the commune of Junglinster, in central Luxembourg.  , the village has a population of 147.

References

Junglinster
Villages in Luxembourg